Gabby is a short-lived Max Fleischer animated cartoon series distributed through Paramount Pictures. Gabby debuted as the town crier in the 1939 animated feature Gulliver’s Travels produced by Fleischer. Shortly afterward, Paramount and Fleischer gave Gabby his own Technicolor spinoff cartoon series, eight entries of which were produced between 1940 and 1941. Gabby was voiced by Pinto Colvig, the voice of Walt Disney's Goofy, and Grumpy and Sleepy from Snow White and the Seven Dwarfs.

Jack Mercer (the voice of Popeye and King Little, Sneak, Snoop, Snitch, and Twinkle Toes in Gulliver’s Travels) was regularly cast alongside  Colvig, as either a king, mayor, snitch, fish, castle worker, fire fighter, or sometimes even as Gabby's humming.

The Gabby cartoons were sold to U.M. & M. TV Corporation in 1955, which later became part of National Telefilm Associates, which became Republic Pictures, and was then sold to Paramount's current parent ViacomCBS (now currently renamed and rebranded as Paramount Global) in 1999. Today, the Gabby cartoons are in the public domain. For official releases, the cartoons are currently syndicated on television by Trifecta Entertainment & Media (inherited from CBS Television Distribution and other companies), original distributor Paramount owns the theatrical rights, and Olive Films owns the DVD rights. However, most Gabby cartoons can be found in faded public domain television prints, usually featuring National Telefilm Associates openings.

Filmography

References

External links
 Gabby at Don Markstein's Toonopedia. Archived from the original on July 31, 2016.
 
 
 
 
 

Fleischer Studios series and characters
Television series by U.M. & M. TV Corporation
Film series introduced in 1940
Animated film series